Willie Taylor is an American former basketball player. He played basketball at a high school in Byhalia, Mississippi. Taylor played college basketball for the LeMoyne–Owen Magicians where he starred as a center from 1965 to 1969. He averaged 18 points and 18 rebounds per game during his senior season.

Taylor was selected by the Philadelphia 76ers as the 28th overall pick in the 1969 NBA draft. He was drafted at the recommendation of a 76ers scout who saw him play at the 1969 Southern Intercollegiate Athletic Conference Tournament where he recorded 25 points and 22 rebounds in a game. Taylor signed a one-year deal with the 76ers on June 30, 1969, but never played in the National Basketball Association (NBA).

References

Year of birth missing (living people)
Living people
African-American basketball players
American men's basketball players
Basketball players from Mississippi
Centers (basketball)
LeMoyne–Owen Magicians basketball players
People from Byhalia, Mississippi
Philadelphia 76ers draft picks
21st-century African-American people